Tan Romeo (born 9 April 1985) is a Singaporean actor, who has been named as one of the 8 Dukes of Caldecott Hill. Tan came into prominence after finishing in fourth place on the tenth season of the television series Star Search in 2010.

Education 
Tan studied at Ngee Ann Secondary School and multimedia technology at ITE MacPherson.

Acting career

Romeo Tan made his television debut on the fourth season of Heartlanders in 2005.

In 2010, after completing his filming for The Best Things in Life, Tan participated in the tenth season of Star Search. He auditioned for the competition and was accepted for the competition. Tan finished in fourth place, losing the title to Jeffrey Xu. He was offered a two-year contract by MediaCorp together with Xu, Adeline Lim, Sora Ma, James Seah, and Darryl Yong. In 2012, Romeo Tan was the first among his fellow Star Search finalists to be given a supporting role in the critically acclaimed police procedural series C.L.I.F.. He was nominated for the Best Newcomer Award at Star Awards 2012 for his performance, but lost the award to Kate Pang. He was then given a role in the star-studded drama series Joys of Life and made a career breakthrough in which he played a role as an antagonist for the first time. His performance was well-received from the public, and was widely regarded as one of the current rising stars. He was given another leading role in Don't Stop Believin', which he played a role of Jin Zhengnan, a charming chef who experienced a love triangle with Du Siman (Felicia Chin) and Wu Yanbin (Elvin Ng). He later also appeared in the year-end blockbuster, It Takes Two as the Fish Prince. In 2013, Romeo Tan replaced Dai Xiang Yu, who was originally selected to play the role of Hong Khee Leong, as the male lead in the drama series Sudden. He was also one of the original singers of the theme song of the drama series, together with Da Feng Chui.

In 2014, he participated in the drama serials, Yes We Can! and The Journey: Tumultuous Times. In 2015, he participated in the drama serials, Good Luck, The Journey: Our Homeland, and The Dream Makers II. He was nominated for Best Actor, Star Awards for Favourite Male Character and won London Choco Roll Happiness Award in Star Awards 2016. In 2016, he participated in a toggle original series as the male lead, Soul Reaper and also he participated in the drama serials Peace & Prosperity and The Dream Job, and won Best Supporting Actor and Top 10 Most Popular Artistes in Star Awards 2017. In 2017, he participated in the films Dream Coder, When Duty Calls, and Life Less Ordinary that led to his second nomination for Best Actor and Best Theme Song in Star Awards 2018. In 2018, he participated in the drama Say Cheese. In 2019, he participated in the dramas How Are You? and All Is Well – Taiwan.

Romeo Tan has gotten 6 out of 10 Top 10 Most Popular Male Artistes from 2014–2015, 2017–2019 and 2021 respectively.

Filmography

Television

Film

Behind The Scene Production

Discography

Compilation album

Awards and nominations

References

External links
 on toggle.sg
The Juliet Club Romeo Tan Official Fanclub

Living people
1985 births
Singaporean male television actors
Nanyang Polytechnic alumni
Singaporean people of Chinese descent
Singaporean people of Hokkien descent